Double or Quits is a 1938 British crime film directed by Roy William Neill and starring Frank Fox, Patricia Medina and Hal Walters.

It was shot at Teddington Studios. It was made as a quota quickie by the British subsidiary of Warner Brothers.

Synopsis
A reporter on a transatlantic cruise ship is accused of theft. In attempting to clear his name he discovers a more serious conspiracy.

Cast
 Frank Fox as Bill Brooks / Scotty Tucker 
 Patricia Medina as Caroline 
 Hal Walters as Alf 
 Ian Fleming as Sir Frederick Beal 
 Gordon McLeod as School 
 Jack Raine as Roland 
 Philip Ray as Hepworth 
 Charles Paton as Mr. Binks 
 Mae Bacon as Mrs. Binks

References

Bibliography
 Chibnall, Steve. Quota Quickies: The Birth of the British 'B' Film. British Film Institute, 2007.
 Low, Rachael. Filmmaking in 1930s Britain. George Allen & Unwin, 1985.
 Wood, Linda. British Films, 1927-1939. British Film Institute, 1986.

External links

1938 films
1938 crime drama films
Films shot at Teddington Studios
Warner Bros. films
Quota quickies
Films directed by Roy William Neill
British crime drama films
British black-and-white films
1930s English-language films
1930s British films